Aristonymus of Athens was sent by Plato to reform the constitution of the Arcadians.  Aristonymus was the father of Clitophon.

Sources 
Plato, Republic, 328b
Plutarch, Reply to Colotes, 1126c

4th-century BC Athenians
Academic philosophers
4th-century BC philosophers